Tillandsia marnieri-lapostollei is a species of flowering plant in the family Bromeliaceae. It is endemic to Ecuador. Its natural habitat is subtropical or tropical dry forests. It is threatened by habitat loss.

Taxonomy
Tillandsia marnieri-lapostollei was first described in 1972 by Werner Rauh. However, this description did not include the then-required Latin diagnosis so was invalid. Rauh validated the name in 1973. The specific epithet marnieri-lapostollei honours Julien Marnier-Lapostolle, a bromeliad collector and owner of Jardin botanique "Les Cèdres".

References

Flora of Ecuador
marnieri-lapostollei
Plants described in 1973
Vulnerable plants
Taxonomy articles created by Polbot